Pie de la Cuesta (Spanish: "foot of the hill") may refer to:

 San Rafael Pie de La Cuesta, in Guatemala
 Pie de la Cuesta, Guerrero, in Mexico